Xiaoqing Ding is a professor and Ph.D. supervisor in the Department of Electronic Engineering, Tsinghua University   in Beijing, China. She graduated from Tsinghua University, China in 1962 with the graduate Golden Medal.

Her research fields include pattern recognition, image processing, character recognition, biometric identification, computer vision, and video surveillance. She works particularly on character & document recognition in Chinese & multi-languages (Japanese, Korean, Arabic, Tibetan, Uygur, Mongolia & English, etc.) and also on face recognition. Dr. Xiaoqing has won four of the most prestigious National Scientific and Technical Progress Awards in China in 1992, 1998, 2003 and 2008. She has also published more than 600 papers, co-authored 7 books and holds 27 Invention Patents. Her character recognition and face recognition systems have been licensed to a number of companies, including MS Office 2000, and are being marketed and deployed worldwide. She is a Fellow of the IEEE (The Institute of Electrical and Electronics Engineers) Fellow and of the IAPR (International Association for Pattern Recognition)    ”

Publications
 B. Su, X. Ding, C. Liu, H. Wang and Y. Wu, "Discriminative Transformation for Multi-Dimensional Temporal Sequences," in IEEE Transactions on Image Processing, vol. 26, no. 7, pp. 3579-3593, July 2017.

References

External links
 https://ieeexplore.ieee.org/author/37270937600
 https://www.tsinghua.edu.cn/publish/eeen/3755/2011/20110318184308867900835/20110318184308867900835_.htm

Year of birth missing (living people)
Living people
Place of birth missing (living people)
Academic staff of Tsinghua University
Tsinghua University alumni
Fellow Members of the IEEE
Fellows of the International Association for Pattern Recognition